The men's kumite 84 kilograms competition at the 2010 Asian Games in Guangzhou, China was held on 26 November 2010 at the Guangdong Gymnasium.

Schedule
All times are China Standard Time (UTC+08:00)

Results

Main bracket

Final

Top half

Bottom half

Repechage

References

External links
Official website

Men's kumite 84 kg